Amphipyra perflua is a moth in the family Noctuidae. It is found from Northern Europe, through Siberia as far east as Korea.

The wingspan is 44–54 mm. The moth flies from July to September in one generation.

The larvae feed on various deciduous trees, such as Crataegus, Populus, Salix, Ulmus, Corylus, Prunus spinosa  and Malus.

References

External links 

 Fauna Europaea
 Lepiforum.de

Amphipyrinae
Moths of Asia
Moths of Europe
Moths described in 1787
Taxa named by Johan Christian Fabricius